The 1967 LSU Tigers football team represented Louisiana State University during the 1967 NCAA University Division football season.

For the second time in three seasons, LSU was extended a bid to a New Year's Day bowl game despite three losses. And as they did in the 1966 Cotton Bowl, the Tigers toppled an undefeated team in the 1968 Sugar Bowl, taking out Wyoming 20–13. It was LSU's last appearance in the Sugar Bowl for 17 years.

Schedule

References

LSU
LSU Tigers football seasons
Sugar Bowl champion seasons
LSU Tigers football